List of Guggenheim Fellowships awarded in 1931. Seventy-seven artists and scholars, including 13 women, received fellowships. Cuban fellows were elected for the first time.

1931 U.S. and Canadian Fellows

1931 Latin American and Caribbean Fellows

See also
Guggenheim Fellowship
 List of Guggenheim Fellowships awarded in 1930
 List of Guggenheim Fellowships awarded in 1932

References
 

1931
1931 awards